Fabrice Pithia (born 7 May 1987) is a Mauritian football player who currently plays for Curepipe Starlight in the Mauritian Premier League and for the Mauritius national football team as a midfielder.

Senior career
Fabrice started his professional career along with his brother Fabien for Savanne SC in the Mauritian League in 2003, at the age of 16. In 2010, he moved on to play for Curepipe Starlight SC, while his brother stayed behind. After the 2011 Indian Ocean Island Games, in which Fabrice was leading scorer and one of the tournament's best players, he received interest from clubs both domestically and abroad, and has stated he is open to playing abroad. Cypriot First Division club AC Omonia showed interest in signing Fabrice, along with his brother Fabien and fellow Mauritian international Gurty Calambé, but nothing came of it.

International career
Fabrice has represented Mauritius internationally since 2006. He was called up to represent Mauritius in the 2011 Indian Ocean Island Games. He scored his first goal for Club M in their opening game against Maldives, a game which ended 1-1. He proceeded to score two more goals in each of the next two games of the group stage to lead Mauritius into the knockout stage. Mauritius eventually made it to the final, but were beaten by Seychelles on penalties.

International goals

Personal
Fabrice has a twin brother, Fabien, who also plays in the Mauritian League for Curepipe Starlight as well as for Club M internationally. Fabrice was featured on the Mauritian national team in the official 2010 FIFA World Cup video game, as he played with Mauritius in 2010 FIFA World Cup qualification matches.

External links

References 

1987 births
Living people
Mauritian footballers
Mauritius international footballers
Curepipe Starlight SC players
Mauritian twins
Twin sportspeople
Mauritian Premier League players
Savanne SC players
Association football midfielders